"Carey" is a song from the 1971 Joni Mitchell album Blue. It was inspired by her time spent with Cary Raditz, living with a cave-dwelling hippie community at Matala, on the Greek island of Crete.

Background
In early 1970, Mitchell's relationship with Graham Nash had recently ended, and she decided to fly to Greece for a break, with a female friend.  Mitchell's European travels, which also encompassed France and Spain, were intended as a "time out" from her increasing fame and fortune in the music business.  After a few days in Athens the two friends traveled to Crete, rented a car and drove to Matala on the south coast of the island.  There, Mitchell met a red-haired cane-carrying American, Cary Raditz, who was working as a cook at the Mermaid café (now the site of the Petra & Votsalo restaurant). She wrote the first version of "Carey" in Matala, for Raditz's 24th birthday.   After about two months, she and Raditz traveled to Athens together, but Mitchell then flew alone to Paris, where she wrote "California", referencing Raditz as a "red, red rogue", and on returning to the U.S. completed "Carey" together with other songs for the Blue album.

Although the song was sometimes rumoured to be about fellow singer-songwriter James Taylor, who plays guitar on some Blue tracks (although not on "Carey" itself) and with whom Mitchell had a brief affair, 
Mitchell stated publicly that the "Carey" in question was Cary Raditz.  References to the village of Matala and the al fresco hippie lifestyle abound in the song lyrics.  Mitchell frequently introduced live performances of "Carey" by recounting anecdotes about Raditz and their Cretan adventures.

In November 2014, The Wall Street Journal published interviews by Marc Myers with Mitchell and Raditz, about the background to the song.   Mitchell said that she "latched on to Cary because he seemed fierce and kept the crowd off my back...    I enjoyed Cary's company, and his audacity....[h]e was a bit of a scoundrel."   Raditz said that his "cane" had in fact been a discarded shepherd's crook, and commented: "I liked Joni a lot and didn't like losing her company.  But on the road, you already know the friendships you develop are short-lived.  That's built into the experience."

Recording and release
While in Europe, Mitchell taught herself to play the Appalachian dulcimer, which was to become a feature of her musical output in the following years. Her dulcimer skills were first showcased on Blue and in particular the original recording of "Carey", which also features Stephen Stills on bass and acoustic guitar. "Carey" was released as a single, debuting at number 93 on the Billboard Chart on September 4, 1971 and lasting just one week; nevertheless, it remains one of Mitchell's most enduring and popular songs.

Albums
"Carey" appears on two Joni Mitchell greatest hits albums – Hits (1996) and Dreamland: The Very Best of Joni Mitchell (2004).

Mitchell herself performed a different interpretation of Carey on her 1974 live album Miles of Aisles.  Backed by jazz band Tom Scott & The LA Express, and recorded at the Universal Amphitheater in Los Angeles, this reggae/ska version has been criticised by Stephen Davis in Rolling Stone, who went so far as to say that the song was "murdered".

Cover versions
In 1972, actress Goldie Hawn recorded her version of the song for her album Goldie (Warner MS 2061). At the televised 2000 tribute concert to Mitchell, held at the Hammerstein Ballroom, New York, the song was performed by Cyndi Lauper.

Charts

References

External links
 Lyrics from jonimitchell.com
 2021 interview with Cary Raditz
 The Mermaid Café from the jonimitchell.com's lyrics glossary (did the Café exist?)
 Acoustic Guitar interview with Mitchell (includes discussion of learning the dulcimer in Greece)
 Miles of Aisles at Amazon.com (includes link to audio clip of "reggae" version)
 
"Elect Kerry" song parody from Am I Right

Songs about hippies
1971 songs
Joni Mitchell songs
Songs written by Joni Mitchell
Song recordings produced by Joni Mitchell
1971 singles
Reprise Records singles